Cryptomyrmex is a genus of ant in the subfamily Myrmicinae. The genus is known from Brazil and Paraguay.

Species
 Cryptomyrmex boltoni (Fernández, 2003)
 Cryptomyrmex longinodus (Fernández, 2003)

References

External links

Myrmicinae
Ant genera
Hymenoptera of South America